Scharbauer may refer to:

People
Clarence Scharbauer (1879–1942), American rancher, oilman, banker
Clarence Scharbauer, Jr. (1925–2014), American rancher and horsebreeder.
John Scharbauer (1852–1941), American rancher, oilman, banker

Other
Scharbauer Cattle Company, a cattle ranching company in Texas and New Mexico, USA
Scharbauer Hotel, a historic hotel in Midland, Texas, USA